Kārlis Eduards Bone (19 February 1899 – 13 November 1941) was a Latvian footballer. He played four matches for the Latvia national football team between 1920 and 1924 and competed in the men's tournament at the 1924 Summer Olympics.

Personal life and death
Bone was son of merchant Fricis Bone and his wife Anna Katrina (nee Zute) and graduated from Riga German Gymnasium in 1918. He served as a volunteer in the Latvian Army Cavalry Squadron during the Latvian War of Independence between 1918 and 1920. He studied law at the University of Latvia from 1920 to 1929.

He served as an additional magistrate at Riga Regional Court 1928-30, assistant to a Sworn Advocate 1934-36, and Member of Cesis City Board 1936-40. He was awarded the Cross of Merit of the Guard in 1939.

Bone married lawyer Anna Kampe with whom he had two sons. During World War II he (with his wife and sons) was deported from Latvia on 14 June 1941, and died in a Soviet prison camp five months later.

References

External links
 

1899 births
1941 deaths
Latvian footballers
Latvia international footballers
Olympic footballers of Latvia
Footballers at the 1924 Summer Olympics
Footballers from Riga
Association football midfielders
Latvian people who died in Soviet detention